Hungribles is a puzzle video game developed by Finnish software development company Futuremark. It was released for iOS in July 2011 and became Apple's iPhone Game of the Week at launch. In March 2012, Futuremark Games Studio was acquired by Rovio Entertainment, creator of Angry Birds.

Gameplay

Hungribles are tiny creatures with massive appetites. Their hunger cravings are so powerful they can pull food through the air and into their mouths. The aim of the game is to feed Hungribles by launching tasty orbs from a mushroom slingshot.

References

Puzzle video games
2011 video games
Video games developed in Finland
IOS games
IOS-only games
Single-player video games